John Arthur Davidson (born February 27, 1953) is a Canadian-American professional ice hockey executive and former player, who serves as President of Hockey Operations and alternate governor for the Columbus Blue Jackets of the National Hockey League (NHL). As a goaltender, he played in the NHL for the St. Louis Blues and New York Rangers, notably helping the Rangers reach the 1979 Stanley Cup Finals.

Davidson is also well known as a long-time hockey broadcaster, and was honored by the Hockey Hall of Fame with the 2009 Foster Hewitt Memorial Award for his contributions to broadcasting.

Playing career
Growing up in western Canada, he played his junior hockey in Calgary, Alberta. He was drafted fifth overall in the 1973 NHL Amateur Draft, and became the first goalie in NHL history to jump directly from major junior to the NHL.

St. Louis Blues
Davidson stepped right into the NHL and split duties with veteran Wayne Stephenson during his rookie year and posted slightly better numbers. Just before the start of Davidson's second season in the league, the Blues dealt Stephenson to the Philadelphia Flyers, making Davidson the Blues' starting goaltender. Davidson played 40 games for the Blues but his goals against average rose from an impressive 3.08 as a rookie to 3.66 in his second year. That summer, the Blues packaged Davidson with Bill Collins and shipped him to the New York Rangers for Jerry Butler, Ted Irvine and Bert Wilson.

New York Rangers
In New York, Davidson was to share the crease with Hall of Famer Ed Giacomin, who had tended goal for the Rangers for the ten previous seasons.  However, early in the year, the Rangers shocked their fans by placing Giacomin on waivers where he was claimed by the Detroit Red Wings, making Davidson the undisputed starting goaltender for the team. Davidson played a career-high 56 games for New York that year, a total he was unable to ever match due to a string of injury issues in the years to come. He helped lead the Rangers to the 1979 Stanley Cup Finals on an injured left knee. His jersey numbers were 35, 00 and 30. Davidson was the first, and one of only two, NHL players to wear the number 00; after Martin Biron briefly wore the number in 1995, the league banned the use of the number.

Davidson was the inspiration for the song "Double Vision" from 1978's album Double Vision by Foreigner. Members of the band who were Rangers fans were watching a Stanley Cup playoff game between the Rangers and the Buffalo Sabres. Davidson was shaken up when a shot hit his goalie mask. As he was recovering, announcers Jim Gordon and Bill Chadwick said Davidson was suffering from "double vision."

Broadcasting career
After retiring due to injury, he joined MSG Network's hockey coverage staff in 1983, and was the color commentator for Rangers games from 1986–87 to 2005–06. Davidson, often known by the nickname "J.D.", became one of the most prominent color commentators in the sport, and his hockey insight is so well respected that he currently sits on the Hockey Hall of Fame selection committee. Long-time network TV partner Mike Emrick also sits on that committee, and the two shared the 2004 Lester Patrick Trophy for service to hockey in the U.S.

Davidson has also contributed to NHL coverage on various national television networks (including CBC, Fox, ESPN/ABC, NBC/OLN, SportsChannel America, and Global). He served as the lead color commentator, partnering with lead play-by-play announcer Mike Emrick, for the NHL on Fox from 1994–1999 and again for the NHL on NBC and NHL on OLN from 2005–2006. Eddie Olczyk, a studio analyst, took over the color commentator position in the 2006–2007 season after he left broadcasting to become president of the St. Louis Blues.

Davidson became known as a broadcaster for his signature phrase of "Oh, baby!" He was also featured in full motion videos shot for the EA Sports video game NHL 97.

Davidson co-authored the book Hockey for Dummies with sportswriter John Steinbreder.

Executive career
Davidson was named president of the St. Louis Blues on June 30, 2006. He left the Blues after agreeing to a buyout of his contract on October 9, 2012.

He was then named president of the Columbus Blue Jackets on October 24, 2012, and held this position until his resignation on May 17, 2019.

On May 17, 2019, Davidson was named as president of the New York Rangers. On May 5, 2021, Davidson was fired as president and alternate governor (along with general manager Jeff Gorton) of the Rangers after failing to make the playoffs.

On May 20, 2021, the Blue Jackets announced that Davidson would return to Columbus as President of Hockey Operations and alternate governor. Davidson agreed to a five-year contract with the Blue Jackets.

Achievements

Playing
Alberta Junior Hockey League – MVP (1970–71)
Alberta Junior Hockey League – Best goalie (1970–71)
Alberta Junior Hockey League – Second team All-Star (1970–71)
Western Canada Hockey League – MVP (1971–72)
Western Canada Hockey League – Top Goaltender Award (1971–72)
Western Canada Hockey League – First All-Star Team (1971–72)
Western Canada Hockey League – All-Star Team (1972–73)
 In the 2009 book 100 Ranger Greats, was ranked No. 56 all-time of the 901 New York Rangers who had played during the team's first 82 seasons

Broadcasting
CableACE – "Outstanding Live Event Coverage" (1994)
New York Emmy – "Outstanding On-Camera Achievement" (1995, 2001)
Lester Patrick Trophy – "Contribution to American hockey" (2004)
Foster Hewitt Memorial Award; Hockey Hall Of Fame (2009)

Career statistics
Source:

Regular season and playoffs

References

External links
JD's official bio
John Davidson has become his sport's top broadcaster, in part by outworking everybody else

1953 births
Living people
Calgary Centennials players
Canadian colour commentators
Canadian emigrants to the United States
Canadian ice hockey goaltenders
Canadian people of British descent
Canadian television sportscasters
Columbus Blue Jackets executives
Denver Spurs players
Edmonton Oil Kings (WCHL) players
Foster Hewitt Memorial Award winners
Ice hockey people from Ottawa
Lester Patrick Trophy recipients
Lethbridge Sugar Kings players
National Hockey League broadcasters
National Hockey League executives
National Hockey League first-round draft picks
New Haven Nighthawks players
New York Rangers announcers
New York Rangers players
St. Louis Blues draft picks
St. Louis Blues executives
St. Louis Blues players
Ice hockey people from Calgary
Springfield Indians players
Edmonton Oilers announcers